Beach Handball has been a Beach South American Games event since 2009 in Montevideo, Uruguay.

Men

Summary

Medal table

Participating nations

Women

Summary

Medal table

Participating nations

References
 www.panamhandball.org

 

Beach handball at multi-sport events
Sports at the South American Games
South American Beach Games